Nikoloz Sekhniashvili ( born December 9, 1993) is a Georgian professional boxer.  As an amateur, Sekhniashvili represented Georgia at the 2015 European Games as a heavyweight.

Professional career 
Sekhniashvili made his professional debut on April 29 2018 at the age of 24. Currently he lives in South Florida and trains with Javiel Centeno. Before joining Centeno's gym, Sekhniashvili had been living and training in Athens, Greece with his original coach Greg Mallios.

In 2019, Sekhniashvili signed a promotional contract with Top Rank.

In November 2019, Sekhniashvili made his debut fight under the Top Rank banner against Eddie Gates at the Addition Financial Arena in Orlando, Florida, winning via technical knockout (TKO).
 
His next fight took place at MGM Grand Las Vegas where he fought against Isiah Jones in a six-rounder at super middleweight. Sekhniashvili defeated the opponent via 6-round decision.    

On August 3, 2021 Sekhniashvili Faced his first defeat via 6 Round Decision agains Guido Emmanuel Schramm in Madison Square Garden   as he suffered a serious injury. 

After almost 15 months out of the ring, Sekhniashvili returned to action in Cleveland, Ohio against the undefeated Rodriguez (6-0 2 KOs) over six rounds.
  Sekhniashvili  picked up the victory by TKO in round 3 of 6.

Professional boxing record

References

External links

 

Living people
1993 births
Middleweight boxers
People from Gori, Georgia
Male boxers from Georgia (country)
Sportspeople from Georgia (country)
21st-century people from Georgia (country)